Margaret Helen Barnard (1898–1992) was a painter and linocut maker.

Barnard was born in Bengal, where her father was serving with the Indian Police Force. At the age of seven she returned to Britain for her education, and went to Bath High School, and St. Leonard's Fife.

Barnard studied at The Glasgow School of Art from 1917 to 1923. She then moved to London, where she attended the Grosvenor School of Modern Art like her contemporary Sybil Andrews, studying under Claude Flight.

In 1924 she married artist Robert George Sang Mackechnie (1894-1975), who would join the British art group the Seven and Five Society in 1927.

The couple lived in Italy for several years, and later they moved to Rye.

During the Second World War she was an ambulance driver, cultivated an allotment and bred rabbits; she resumed painting after the end of the war, and continued to exhibit at the Royal Academy until her death.

In 1990 she made a bequest of her own works and her husband's, as well as their personal collection of works by other artists, to the Rye Art Gallery.

Barnard died in 1992.

References

External links
 Rye Art Gallery collection.

1898 births
1992 deaths
20th-century British printmakers
20th-century British women artists
Alumni of the Grosvenor School of Modern Art
Alumni of the Glasgow School of Art
British women in World War I
Women printmakers
British women painters
British people in colonial India